The French ironclad Flandre was one of ten  armored frigates built for the French Navy in the 1860s. Commissioned in 1865, she was initially assigned to the Northern Squadron and sometimes served as a flagship. The ironclad played a minor role in the Franco-Prussian War of 1870–1871, blockading the North Sea coast of Prussia. Flandre was decommissioned after the war and remained in reserve for the next decade and a half. The ship was disarmed in 1884 and was scrapped three years later.

Design and description

The Provence class was designed as an enlarged version of the s with thicker armor, more powerful guns, and better seakeeping qualities. They displaced . Their crew numbered 579–594 officers and enlisted men.

Flandre had a single two-cylinder horizontal-return connecting-rod compound steam engine that drove the propeller shaft, using steam provided by eight boilers.

Armament and protection
Two of the 164.7 mm guns served as chase guns. By 1869–1870, Flandre had been equipped with eight  Modèle 1864 RMLs and four 194 mm Modèle 1864 weapons serving as chase guns.

The conning tower's sides consisted of  armor plates.

Construction and career

Flandre, named after the historic province, was ordered on 16 November 1860 from the Arsenal de Cherbourg. The ship was laid down on 28 January 1861 and launched on 12 June 1864. She was commissioned for trials on 20 February 1865, completed in April and was definitively commissioned the following month.

Flandre was assigned to the Ironclad Division of the Northern Squadron, based in Cherbourg. She made cruises to Portuguese Madeira and Spanish Tenerife, in the Canary Islands, over the next two years.

Together with the ironclad , the ship visited Plymouth, England, on 17–19 July to take part in the Exhibition of the Royal Agricultural Society. To reciprocate British hospitality, the French invited the Channel Fleet to visit Cherbourg on Emperor Napoleon III's birthday in August. They arrived on 14 August and remained for four days, their crew's exchanging ship visits, touring the dockyard and participating in multiple banquets and balls. The British invited the Ironclad Division and the Mediterranean Squadron to visit Portsmouth. The French ships, including Flandre, arrived later that month and remained until 2 September; their crews similarly occupied as the British were earlier.

In January 1867, Flandre collided with the British merchantman Brutus in the Atlantic Ocean. Brutus sank with the loss of ten of her fourteen crew. Together with Magnanime and Magenta, Flandre escorted the transports ferrying French troops home after the collapse of the Second French intervention in Mexico in 1867. Two years later she became the flagship of Rear Admiral Charles de Dompierre d'Hornoy.

When the Franco-Prussian War began on 19 July 1870, France needed time to complete its mobilization. The ship was assigned to Vice Admiral Édouard Bouët-Willaumez's squadron that was tasked to blockade German ports in the Heligoland Bight. It left Cherbourg on 24 July and, failing to find any German ships, proceeded to Danish waters to await further orders. Bouët-Williaumez was ordered on 2 August to split his forces with half, including Flandre, proceeding into the Baltic Sea to blockade the Prussian ports there under his command and the others to return to the Bight. The strong Prussia coastal defenses prevented any attack by the French ships, but the French presence severely inhibited German shipping.

The neutral British had denied the French permission to bunker at Heligoland, so the ships were forced to do so at sea under dangerous conditions. Bad weather and a series of storms beginning in late August prevented the squadron from bunkering and the ships were forced to return to France in early September. By then Prussia was besieging Paris and many of the trained gunners aboard the squadron's ships were transferred to defend the city. The squadron resumed the blockade with reduced crews until December when smaller ships took it over. In a storm on 12 October, the armored frigate  lost her rudder and had to be towed back to Cherbourg by Flandre.

The ship was paid off in Cherbourg on 18 March 1871 and was briefly reactivated on 20 October 1873 to test a torpedo-outrigger system. Flandre was rearmed in 1875 with Modèle 1870 guns, but remained in reserve until she was disarmed in November 1884. Flandre stricken from the naval register on 12 November 1886 and scrapped in 1887.

Citations

Bibliography

 

1864 ships
Provence-class ironclads
Ships built in France